A total solar eclipse occurred at the Moon's descending node of the orbit on Saturday, June 30, 1973. A solar eclipse occurs when the Moon passes between Earth and the Sun, thereby totally or partly obscuring the image of the Sun for a viewer on Earth. A total solar eclipse occurs when the Moon's apparent diameter is larger than the Sun's, blocking all direct sunlight, turning day into darkness. Totality occurs in a narrow path across Earth's surface, with the partial solar eclipse visible over a surrounding region thousands of kilometres wide.

With a maximum eclipse of 7 minutes and 3.55 seconds, this was the last total solar eclipse that exceeds 7 minutes in this series. The last total eclipse over 7 minutes was on July 1, 1098 which lasted 7 minutes and 5 seconds. There will not be a longer total solar eclipse until June 25, 2150.

The greatest eclipse occurred in the Agadez area in the northwest of Niger not far from Algeria inside the Sahara Desert somewhat 40 km east of the small mountain of Ebenenanoua at 18.8 N and 5.6 E and occurred at 11:38 UTC.

The umbral portion of the path started near the border of Guyana and the Brazilian state Roraima, passed northern Dutch Guiana (today's Suriname), headed into the Atlantic, included one of the Portuguese Cape Verde (today's Cape Verde) Islands, which was Santo Antão, Nouadhibou and Nouakchott and other parts of Central Mauritania, northern Mali, the southernmost of Algeria, the middle and southeastern Niger, the middle of Chad, the Sudan including Darfur and parts that are now in the South Sudan including Kodok, a part of the northernmost Uganda, a part of northern Kenya, the southernmost of Somalia, and the Alphonse Group of British Seychelles (today's Seychelles).

Observations 
This eclipse was observed by a group of scientists, which included Donald Liebenberg, from the Los Alamos National Laboratory. They used two airplanes to extend the apparent time of totality by flying along the eclipse path in the same direction as the Moon's shadow as it passed over Africa. One of the planes was a prototype (c/n 001) of what was later to become the Concorde, which has a top speed of almost  (Mach 2). This enabled scientists from Los Alamos, the Paris Observatory, the Kitt Peak National Observatory, Queen Mary University of London, the University of Aberdeen and CNRS to extend totality to more than 74 minutes; nearly 10 times longer than is possible when viewing a total solar eclipse from a stationary location. That Concorde was specially modified with rooftop portholes for the mission, and is currently on display with the Solar Eclipse mission livery at Musée de l’air et de l’espace. The data gathered resulted in three papers published in Nature and a book.

The eclipse was also observed by a charter flight from Mount San Antonio College in Southern California. The DC-8 with 150 passengers intercepted the eclipse at  just off the east coast of Africa and tracked the eclipse for three minutes. The passengers rotated seats every 20 seconds so that each passenger had three 20 second opportunities at the window to observe and take pictures.  A separate observation opportunity was provided on a specialized commercial cruise by the S.S. Canberra, which traveled from New York City to the Canary Islands and Dakar, Senegal, observing 5 minutes and 44 seconds of totality out in the Atlantic between those two stops in Africa.   That cruise's passengers included notables in the scientific community such as Neil Armstrong, Scott Carpenter,  Isaac Asimov, Walter Sullivan, and the then 15-years old Neil deGrasse Tyson.

Related eclipses

Eclipses in 1973 
 An annular solar eclipse on Thursday, 4 January 1973.
 A penumbral lunar eclipse on Thursday, 18 January 1973.
 A penumbral lunar eclipse on Friday, 15 June 1973.
 A total solar eclipse on Saturday, 30 June 1973.
 A penumbral lunar eclipse on Sunday, 15 July 1973.
 A partial lunar eclipse on Monday, 10 December 1973.
 An annular solar eclipse on Monday, 24 December 1973.

Solar eclipses of 1971–1974

Saros 136

Metonic series

Notes

References
 Foto Solar eclipse of June 30, 1973
 Foto Solar eclipse of June 30, 1995 from Russia expedition
 http://eclipse.gsfc.nasa.gov/SEplot/SEplot1951/SE1973Jun30T.GIF

1973 06 30
1973 in science
1973 06 30
June 1973 events